Danilo Fernandes Batista (born 3 April 1988, in Guarulhos) is a Brazilian footballer who plays as a goalkeeper for Bahia.

Career
Danilo Fernandes Batista, born in Guarulhos-SP, was revealed in the youth categories of Corinthians. He moved to Sport in 2015. In 2016 he signed contract with Internacional. Danilo and fellow player Matheus Bahia were injured in the 2022 EC Bahia bus attack.

International career
In January 2017, he called to Brazilian team by coach Tite for a friendly game against Colombia. Only footballers playing for Brazilian clubs were called up. However, he did not appear in this match. Later Fernandes hoped he could make a return to the national side, which has yet to happen.

Career statistics

Honours
Corinthians
Campeonato Brasileiro Série A: 2011
Copa Libertadores: 2012
FIFA Club World Cup: 2012
Campeonato Paulista: 2013
Recopa Sudamericana: 2013

References

External links
 at Timaopedia
 ogol.com

1988 births
Living people
People from Guarulhos
Brazilian footballers
Association football goalkeepers
Campeonato Brasileiro Série A players
Campeonato Brasileiro Série B players
Sport Club Corinthians Paulista players
Sport Club do Recife players
Sport Club Internacional players
Esporte Clube Bahia players
Footballers from São Paulo (state)